Kröpcke is the central square of the city of Hanover in Germany. The square is situated at the crossroads of Georgstraße, Karmarschstraße, Bahnhofstraße and Rathenaustraße. It is named after Wilhelm Kröpcke, one of the owners of the former Café Robby, which was erected on the then-nameless square in 1869. Kröpcke leased the café in 1876, changed the business's name to Café Kröpcke and operated the café until 1919. Eventually, the square adopted the name from the café and in 1948 was officially named Kröpcke by the city of Hanover.

One of its notable features is the Kröpcke clock, which is a 1977 replica of an 1885 clock that was scrapped after World War II.

Stadtbahn station 

The station Kröpcke is the main station in the Hanover Stadtbahn network. It was built from 1968 to 1974 and opened in several parts through the 1970s and 1980s. At the time, it was one of Hanover's largest construction sites, extending more than  underground. Today, all Stadtbahn lines except two call at the station and it is the main interchange point for the network. It has six platforms in total on three lines that cross each other in independent tunnels.

Level -1

Main entrance and access to  Niki-de-Saint-Phalle-Promenade.

Level -2

 A line toward Hauptbahnhof and Markthalle.
 B line toward Hauptbahnhof and Aegidientorplatz.
 Connection between A line to Markthalle and B line to Aegidientorplatz

Level -2.5

Connecting level with escalators and staircases to the A, B and C lines.

Level -3

 C line toward Steintor and Aegidientorplatz.

The station underwent extensive modernisation prior to Expo 2000, including hiding its 1970s colours tilework behind large murals.

Next stations

External links 

Squares in Hanover

it:Kröpcke (Stadtbahn di Hannover)